First Security Bank is a privately held company based in Searcy, Arkansas. It currently operates 78 
locations across the state of Arkansas and is a division of Arkansas’ fifth largest bank holding company, First Security Bancorp. First Security owns the recognizable First Security Center in Downtown Little Rock, located in the historic River Market District.

Company history

First Security Bank was chartered in 1932 in Searcy, Arkansas, under the name of Security Bank. In 1966, the name was officially changed to First Security Bank. The bank was originally located at the corner of Arch Street and Spring Street but in 1971 moved to its current location at 314 N. Spring Street, on the corner of Spring Street and Race Street.

In 1977, Reynie Rutledge purchased First Security Bank and in 1981 created a bank-holding company that is now known as First Security Bancorp. Through the years, First Security Bancorp has acquired and established several financial organizations to create Arkansas’ sixth largest bank-holding company.

In 2004, First Security opened its first branch in Little Rock on Cantrell Road. Soon after, construction was completed on the First Security Center in the Little Rock Rivermarket District. The building is the tallest in the Rivermarket area and houses a First Security branch, a six-story Marriott Courtyard Hotel, and several floors of office space and luxury condominiums.

First Security has over $4 billion in assets and over 900 employees working in 72 locations throughout the state in 2014.

Historical highlights

 1977 - Reynie Rutledge purchases First Security Bank of Searcy
 1979 - Established First Security Mortgage
 1981 - Rutledge forms bank holding company, doing business as First of Searcy, Inc
 1989 - Acquired Peoples Bank & Trust of Mountain Home
 1991 - Holding company name changed to First Security Bancorp & acquired Citizens Bank of Beebe
 1995 - Acquired Farmers Bank & Trust Company of Clarksville
 1997 - Acquired First Community Bank of Conway
 1999 - Established First Security Bank of Northwest Arkansas
 2000 - First Security Bancorp granted financial services holding company status & acquired Crews & Associates
 2001 - Established partnership with The Vanadis Group & established First Security Leasing
 2003 - Acquired First National Bank of Springdale
 2004 - Acquired Beardsley Public Finance & opened First Security Center in Little Rock
 2005 - Established First Security Wealth Management / Established First Security Student Loan Division
 2009 - Acquired Union Bank of Benton

Services and locations

First Security sells a variety of financial products and services including personal, commercial and mortgage loans; all types of checking and savings accounts; certificates of deposit; debit cards, trust services; safe deposit boxes; wire transfers; internet and mobile banking; and locally issued Visa/MasterCard credit cards.

First Security Bank has banking centers located in: Beebe, Benton, Bentonville, Bryant, Bull Shoals, Cabot, Centerton, Clarksville, Clinton, Conway, Farmington, Fayetteville, Fort Smith, Gassville, Greenbrier, Heber Springs, Hot Springs, Jonesboro, Judsonia, Little Rock, Lowell, Maumelle, Mayflower, McRae, Mountain Home, Mountain View, North Little Rock, Pangburn, Prairie Creek, Russellville, Rogers, Searcy, Sherwood, Springdale and Vilonia.

References

Sources
First Security Takes Long View  http://www.arkansasbusiness.com/article.aspx?aID=124269.54928.136392&view=all&link=perm

First Security Content To Grown Within Arkansas  http://www.arkansasbusiness.com/article.aspx?aID=124081

Bank Deposits Grow 5% in Arkansas, Says FDIC  http://www.arkansasbusiness.com/article.aspx?aID=124075.54928.136216

First Security Bank  http://investing.businessweek.com/research/stocks/private/snapshot.asp?privcapId=4373906

End of Era:  Union Bank Sale Closes  http://www.bentoncourier.com/content/view/136433/1/

Top 5 Biggest Banks in Arkansas  http://www.todaysthv.com/news/business/story.aspx?storyid=103962&catid=119

Arkansas Banks Outperform National Average  http://www.talkbusiness.net/article/ARKANSAS-BANKS-OUTPERFORMING-NATIONAL-AVERAGE/462/

Bank of Ozarks, First Security Ranked Tops in Region by SNL Financial  http://www.arkansasbusiness.com/article.aspx?aID=131129.54928.143268

http://www.fdic.gov

http://www.fsbancorp.com/about_us.htm

External links
 FSBank.com
 First Security Mortgage
 Crews & Associates, Inc.
 Only In Arkansas

Banks based in Arkansas
Banks established in 1932
Companies based in Arkansas